Live Vol. 1 is the eighth LP album and first live album released 1981 by the Danish rock band Gnags, the album was released digitally remastered 1995 on CD.

Track listing 
 Rytmehans — 3:22
 Vent på mig Vent — 6:04
 Under Bøgen — 2:57
 Burhøns — 7:49
 Green Leaves — 4:08
 Hva' så skal I prøve — 8:11
 Nøgler til Alle — 3:19
 For Glæden og Kærligheden — 3:39

Gnags albums
1981 live albums